Brian Gill, Lord Gill,  (born 25 February 1942) is a retired Scottish judge and legal academic. He served as Lord President and Lord Justice General from June 2012 until May 2015. Gill previously served as Lord Justice Clerk from 2001 to 2012, and as Chairman of the Scottish Law Commission from 1996 to 2001. As an advocate, he practised principally in agricultural law and is the author of The Law of Agricultural Holdings in Scotland. In 2007–2009, Gill undertook a far-reaching review of the civil courts system in Scotland, recommending a shift of much of the workload of the Court of Session to Scotland's local sheriff courts.

Education
Gill was born in Glasgow and educated at St Aloysius' College, an independent Jesuit school in the city. He studied at the School of Law of the University of Glasgow (M.A., LL.B.), where he was a member of the Glasgow University Union and Dialectic Society, and at Edinburgh where he gained his PhD in 1975 and lectured in the Faculty of Law from 1964 until 1977. He was awarded Honorary Degrees by Glasgow University in 1998 (LL.D.), Edinburgh University in 2007, and the University of Abertay, Dundee, in 2008 (LL.D.).

Career
He was admitted to the Faculty of Advocates in 1967 and appointed Queen's Counsel in 1981. He was called to the English Bar (Lincoln's Inn) in 1991. Lord Gill was an Advocate Depute from 1977 to 1979, and standing Junior Counsel to the Foreign and Commonwealth Office (1974–77), the Home Office (1979–81) and the Scottish Education Department (1979–81). He has been a member of the Scottish Legal Aid Board and the Scottish Valuation Advisory Council and Deputy Chairman of the Copyright Tribunal. Gill was appointed a Senator of the College of Justice in 1994, and was Chairman of the Scottish Law Commission from 1996 until 2001. Lord Gill was appointed Lord Justice Clerk and President of the Second Division of the Inner House of the Court of Session in November 2001.

From 1987 to 1994 he was Keeper of the Advocates' Library and a Trustee of the National Library of Scotland. He is the author of The Law of Agricultural Holdings in Scotland.

He retired as Lord President in May 2015. Since then he has sat on occasion as an acting judge of the United Kingdom Supreme Court.

See also
List of Senators of the College of Justice

References

1942 births
Living people
Lawyers from Glasgow
Members of the Faculty of Advocates
Members of Lincoln's Inn
Gill
Scottish non-fiction writers
Academics of the University of Edinburgh
Alumni of the University of Edinburgh
Alumni of the University of Glasgow
Members of the Privy Council of the United Kingdom
Fellows of the Royal Society of Edinburgh
People educated at St Aloysius' College, Glasgow